Subodh Chandra Hansda (born at Village Jubrajpur, Midnapore district, 1927) was member of 5th Lok Sabha from Medinipur (Lok Sabha constituency) in West Bengal State, India.

References

India MPs 1962–1967
India MPs 1957–1962
India MPs 1971–1977
India MPs 1952–1957
West Bengal politicians
Lok Sabha members from West Bengal
People from Etawah district
People from Lakhimpur Kheri
Possibly living people
1927 births